The 2017–18 season saw Glasgow Warriors compete in the competitions: the Guinness Pro14 and the European Champions Cup.

Season overview

League expansion
With the addition of two South African sides, the Pro12 expanded to become the Pro14 for season 2017–18.

The format of the league changed to accommodate the extra teams. It was split into two conferences and matches played in a conference system with the addition of 2 derby fixtures. The play-off system also changed with the winners of the conferences hosting a Semi-Final and each conference runners up and 3rd place teams playing off in Quarter-Final fixtures.

For the Pro14's inaugural season, Glasgow Warriors were placed in a conference with the Ospreys, Cardiff Blues, Munster, Connacht, Zebre and Cheetahs.

New coach, new captain
Dave Rennie was installed as new Head Coach in August 2017. One of his first decisions was to scrap the co-captaincy enjoyed by Jonny Gray and Henry Pyrgos. Ryan Wilson was picked as Warriors captain for the season.

Team

Coaches
Head coach:  Dave Rennie 
Assistant coach:   Kenny Murray
Assistant coach:   Jonathan Humphreys
Assistant coach:   Jason O'Halloran
Assistant coach:   Mike Blair
 Head Strength and Conditioning Coach:  Phil Healey
 Asst. Strength and Conditioning Coach:  Francisco Tavares 
 Asst. Strength and Conditioning Coach:  George Petrakos
 Lead Performance Analyst: Toby West
 Asst. Performance Analyst: Greg Woolard

Staff

 Managing Director: Nathan Bombrys
 Chairman: Charles Shaw
 Advisory Group: Walter Malcolm, Douglas McCrea, Alan Lees, Jim Preston, Paul Taylor
 Rugby Operations Manager: John Manson
 Kit manager & Masseur: Dougie Mills
 Clinical Manager and Team Physiotherapist: Nicola McGuire
 Rehabilitation Physiotherapist: Gabrielle McCullough
 Team doctor: Dr. David Pugh
 Commercial Operations Manager: Alastair Kellock
 Communications Manager: Jeremy Bone
 Communications Asst: Jack Reid
 Operations manager: Stephanie Karvelis
 Marketing and Partnerships Manager: Darroch Ramsay
 Partnership Sales Manager: Laura Hynd
 Partnership Account Manager: Oliver Norman
 Partnership Account Manager: Jim Taylor
 Game On Project Development Officer: Lindsey Smith
 Community Rugby Coach: Stuart Lewis

Squad

BT Sport Scottish Rugby Academy Stage 3 players
Scottish Rugby Academy players who have been assigned to a Professional club are Stage 3 players. These players are assigned to Glasgow Warriors for the season 2017–18. Dan York was added to the Glasgow Stage 3 academy squad in the Scottish Rugby Academy's second intake in the 2017–18 season.

Academy players promoted in the course of the season are listed with the main squad.

  Robbie Smith - Hooker
  Grant Stewart - Hooker
  Euan McLaren - Prop
  Adam Nicol - Prop
  Dan York - Prop
  Hamilton Burr - Lock
  Bruce Flockhart - Flanker (Loan out)
  George Stokes - Flanker

  Kaleem Barreto - Scrum half
  Josh Henderson - Fly-half (Loan out)
  Stafford McDowall - Centre
  Robbie Nairn - Wing
  Sam Yawayawa - Wing

Back up players

Other players used by Glasgow Warriors over the course of the season.

  Charlie Shiel (Edinburgh) - Scottish Rugby Academy Stage 3 player - Scrum half
  Gary Strain (Glasgow Hawks) - Prop

Player statistics

During the 2017–18 season, Glasgow have used fifty-four different players in competitive games. The table below shows the number of appearances and points scored by each player.

Staff movements

Coaches

Personnel in
  Dave Rennie from  Chiefs
  Jonathan Humphreys from  Scotland
  Jason O'Halloran from  Scotland
  Phil Healey from  Chiefs
  Francisco Tavares from  Chiefs
  Toby West from  Scotland

Personnel out
  Gregor Townsend to  Scotland
  Matt Taylor to  Scotland
  Dan McFarland to  Scotland
  Stuart Yule to  Scotland
  Gavin Vaughan to  Scotland
  Thibault Giroud to  Toulon

Player movements

Academy promotions
  Jamie Bhatti from Scottish Rugby Academy
  George Horne from Scottish Rugby Academy
  Patrick Kelly from Scottish Rugby Academy
  Matt Fagerson from Scottish Rugby Academy
  Robert Beattie from Scottish Rugby Academy

Player transfers

In
 Oli Kebble from  Stormers
 Huw Jones from  Stormers
 Callum Gibbins from  Hurricanes
 Adam Hastings from  Bath Rugby
 Lelia Masaga from  Chiefs
 Samuela Vunisa from  Saracens
 Kiran McDonald from  Hull
 Brandon Thomson from  Stormers
 George Turner from  Edinburgh Rugby (loan)
 Siua Halanukonuka from  Highlanders
 Ruaridh Jackson from  Harlequins
 Nikola Matawalu from  Exeter Chiefs
 Ryan Grant from  Edinburgh Rugby
 Max McFarland from  Clontarf
 George Turner from  Edinburgh Rugby
 D. T. H. van der Merwe from  Newcastle Falcons

Out
  Mark Bennett to  Edinburgh Rugby
  Gordon Reid to  London Irish
  Josh Strauss to  Sale Sharks
  Simone Favaro to  Fiamme Oro
  Djustice Sears-Duru to  Ontario Blues
  Sila Puafisi to  Brive
  Sean Lamont retired
  Grayson Hart to  Ealing Trailfinders
  Tjiuee Uanivi to  London Scottish
  Peter Murchie released
  Junior Bulumakau  to  Doncaster Knights
  Fraser Lyle  to  London Scottish
  Nemia Kenatale released
  Hagen Schulte to  Heidelberger RK
 Corey Flynn released
  Josh Henderson to  Stade Niçois (loan out)
  Bruce Flockhart to  Stade Niçois (loan out)
  Hugh Blake to  Bay of Plenty Steamers
 George Turner to  Edinburgh Rugby (loan ends)

Competitions

Pre-season and friendlies

Match 1

Glasgow Warriors: 15 Rory Hughes, 14 Leonardo Sarto, 13 Paddy Kelly, 12 Sam Johnson, 11 Robbie Nairn, 10 Adam Hastings, 9 George Horne,1 Jamie Bhatti, 2 James Malcolm, 3 D’arcy Rae, 4 Greg Peterson, 5 Scott Cummings, 6 Matt Fagerson, 7 Matt Smith, 8 Adam Ashe (capt)
Replacements: 16 Alex Allan, 17 Grant Stewart, 18 Adam Nicol, 19 Brian Alainu’uese, 20 Kiran McDonald, 21 George Stokes, 22 Hamilton Burr, 23 Chris Fusaro, 24 Lewis Wynne , 25 Charlie Shiel, 26 Stafford McDowell, 27 Lee Jones, 28 Robert Beattie
(all used)

Northampton Saints: Ben Foden (capt), Jamie Elliott, Ahsee Tuala, Luther Burrell, Juan Pablo Estelles, Piers Francis, Nic GroomCampese Ma’afu, Charlie Clare, Jamal Ford-Robinson, David Ribbans, James Craig, Jamie Gibson, Lewis Ludlam, Mitch Eadie.Replacements: Dylan Hartley, Alex Waller, Kieran Brookes, Paul Hill, Michael Paterson, Reece Marshall, Christian Day, Ben Nutley,Teimana Harrison, Alex Mitchell, James Grayson, Rory Hutchinson, Tom Stephenson, Juan Pablo Estelles, George Furbank, Harry Mallinder (all used)

Match 2

Dragons: Zane Kirchner; Ashton Hewitt, Tyler Morgan, Sam Beard, Hallam Amos; Angus O’Brien, Charlie Davies; Brok Harris, Elliot Dee, Leon Brown, Matthew Screech, Ashley Sweet, James Thomas (c), Ollie Griffiths, James Benjamin
Replacements: Rhys Buckley, Thomas Davies, Lloyd Fairbrother, Lennon Greggains, Nic Cudd, Sarel Pretorius,Dorian Jones, Adam Warren, Adam Hughes, Jarred Rosser, Pat Howard, Mike Snook.

Glasgow Warriors: 15. Ruaridh Jackson, 14. Lee Jones, 13. Nick Grigg, 12. Sam Johnson, 11. Rory Hughes, 10. Adam Hastings, 9. George Horne1. Jamie Bhatti, 2. James Malcolm, 3. D'arcy Rae, 4. Brian Alainu'uese, 5. Scott Cummings, 6. Lewis Wynne, 7. Chris Fusaro, 8. Adam Ashe (C)
Replacements: 16. George Turner, 17. Gary Strain, 18. Adam Nicol, 19. Greg Peterson, 20. Kiran McDonald, 21. Hamilton Burr,22. Matt Smith, 23. Matt Fagerson, 24. Henry Pyrgos, 25. Peter Horne, 26. Patrick Kelly, 27. Lelia Masaga, 28. Stafford McDowell

Pro14

League table

Results

Round 1

Round 2

Round 3

Round 4

Round 5

Round 6

Round 7

Round 8

Round 9

Round 10

Round 11 - 1872 Cup 1st Leg

Round 12 - 1872 Cup 2nd Leg

Round 13

Round 14

Round 15

Round 16

Round 17

 Match rescheduled from 2 March 2018.

Round 18

Round 19

Round 20

Round 21 - 1872 Cup 3rd Leg

Edinburgh won the 1872 Cup with a series score of 2 - 1.

Play-offs

Semi-finals

Europe
In the European Rugby Champions Cup pool stage, Glasgow Warriors were placed as Tier 4 seeds and drawn with the English champions Exeter Chiefs, the French side Montpellier coached by former Scotland boss Vern Cotter and Irish side Leinster. The fixtures were announced on 22 August 2017.

Pool

Results

Round 1

Round 2

Round 3

Round 4

Round 5

Round 6

Warrior of the month awards

End of Season awards

Competitive debuts this season

A player's nationality shown is taken from the nationality at the highest honour for the national side obtained; or if never capped internationally their place of birth. Senior caps take precedence over junior caps or place of birth; junior caps take precedence over place of birth. A player's nationality at debut may be different from the nationality shown. Combination sides like the British and Irish Lions or Pacific Islanders are not national sides, or nationalities.

Players in BOLD font have been capped by their senior international XV side as nationality shown.

Players in Italic font have capped either by their international 7s side; or by the international XV 'A' side as nationality shown.

Players in normal font have not been capped at senior level.

A position in parentheses indicates that the player debuted as a substitute. A player may have made a prior debut for Glasgow Warriors in a non-competitive match, 'A' match or 7s match; these matches are not listed.

Tournaments where competitive debut made:

Crosshatching indicates a jointly hosted match.

Sponsorship
 SP Energy Networks - Title Sponsor and Community Sponsor
 Scottish Power - Official Kit

Official Kit Supplier

 Macron

Official kit sponsors
 Malcolm Group
 McCrea Financial Services
 Denholm Oilfield
 Ross Hall Hospital
 Story Contracting

Official sponsors
 The Famous Grouse
 Clyde Travel Management
 Harper Macleod
 Caledonia Best
 Eden Mill Brewery and Distillery
 David Lloyd Leisure
 Crabbie's
 CALA Homes
 Capital Solutions
 Martha's Restaurant
 Sterling Furniture

Official partners
 A.G. Barr
 Benchmarx
 Black & Lizars
 Cameron House
 Glasgow Airport
 Healthspan Elite
 Mentholatum
 MSC Nutrition
 Smile Plus
 Lenco Utilities
 Scot JCB News Scotland
 HF Group
 Primestaff
 Village Hotel Club
 The Crafty Pig
 Kooltech
 Savills
 iPro Sports
 RHA

References

2017-18
2017–18 in Scottish rugby union
2017–18 Pro14 by team
2017–18 European Rugby Champions Cup by team